The 2018 South American Basketball Championship for Women was the 36th edition of the tournament. Eight teams was featured in the competition, held in Tunja, Colombia from August 30–September 4.

Preliminary round

Group A

Group B

Classification 5th–8th places

Semifinals 5th–8th

Classification 7th–8th

Classification 5th–6th

Final round

Semifinals

Third place game

Final

Final standings

References

External links
Official website

2018 in women's basketball
Women
2018 in Colombian women's sport
International basketball competitions hosted by Colombia
South American Basketball Championship for Women
August 2018 sports events in South America
September 2018 sports events in South America